Keith Douglas Suter  (born 1948) is an Australian consultant on strategic planning and a futurist.

Suter has achieved three doctorates. The first of these was about the international law of guerrilla warfare (University of Sydney), and the second about the social and economic consequences of the arms race (Deakin University) and a third doctorate on scenario planning (Sydney University). He was awarded the Australian Government's Peace Medal in 1986: The International Year of Peace and was Rostrum's "Communicator of the Year" in 1995.

In the 2019 Queen's Birthday Honours, Suter was appointed Member of the Order of Australia (AM) for "significant service to international relations, and to the Uniting Church in Australia".

He has been appointed to many roles throughout his career, including chairperson of the International Humanitarian Law Committee of Australian Red Cross (NSW), chairperson of the International Commission of Jurists (NSW), director of studies at the International Law Association (Australian Branch) and managing director of the Global Directions think tank.

He has also been a member of the Club of Rome since 1993. The club is “an informal association of independent leading personalities from politics, business and science, men and women who are long-term thinkers interested in contributing in a systemic interdisciplinary and holistic manner to a better world. The Club of Rome members share a common concern for the future of humanity and the planet.” The club has only 100 members, with Mikhail Gorbachev amongst them.

Suter is a life member of the United Nations Association of Australia in recognition of his service. At various times from 1978 to 1999, he served as the national president of the organisation and took on the roles of the Western Australia and New South Wales state president. He was the president of the Centre for Peace and Conflict Studies (1991-1998) at the University of Sydney and a consultant on social policy with the Wesley Mission for 17 years. In addition, he served as a consultant for a number of other organisations, with a focus on local and international issues.

He is also an active member of the Australian Institute of Company Directors. He frequently appears on radio and television discussing politics and international affairs. He has been for many years the Foreign Affairs Editor on Australia's Channel 7’s Sunrise program.

Positions held
 Member of Club of Rome, the global think tank on economic and environmental matters, since 1991.
 President of the United Nations Association (NSW) and President of the Society for International Development (Sydney Chapter).
 Culture and politics guest speaker at Wesley Institute, Drummoyne NSW, Australia.
 Member, Australian Foreign Minister’s National Consultative Committee on International Security Issues, Canberra
 Consultant Conflict Resolution Network, Sydney
 Director of Studies, International Law Association, Australian Branch
 Chairperson, International Humanitarian Law Committee of Australian Red Cross (NSW)
 Chairperson, International Commission of Jurists (NSW)
 Lecturer, Workers' Educational Association, Sydney 
 Visiting Lecturer, Department of Politics, Macquarie University
 Visiting Lecturer, Sydney International Programs, Boston University, USA

Published works

 An International Law of Guerrilla Warfare: The Global Politics of Law-Making, Palgrave Macmillan, London, 1984
 Is there Life after ANZUS: New Directions for the Peace Movement, Pluto, Sydney, 1987
 Antarctica: Private Property or Public Heritage?, Zed, London, 1991
 Global Agenda, Albatross, Sydney, 1994
 Global Change, Albatross, Sydney, 1996
 Legal Studies, Macmillan, Melbourne, 2000
 In Defence of Globalisation, University of NSW Press, Sydney, 2001
 Global Order and Global Disorder: Globalization and the Nation-State, Praeger, Westport, CONN, 2002
 Global Notebook, Random House, Sydney, 2005
 Teach Yourself Globalization, Hodder, London, 2006
 Local Notebook, Random House, Sydney, 2007
 All About Terrorism, Random House, Sydney, 2008

References

External links
 Official site
 ICMI Speaker
 Online Opinion
 Australian Business Foundation
 Sunrise Seven Regulars

Australian social scientists
Living people
Academic staff of Macquarie University
1948 births
Members of the Order of Australia